John Currin (born 1962) is an American painter based in New York City. He is best known for satirical figurative paintings which deal with provocative sexual and social themes in a technically skillful manner. His work shows a wide range of influences, including sources as diverse as the Renaissance, popular culture magazines, and contemporary fashion models. He often distorts or exaggerates the erotic forms of the female body, and has stressed that his characters are reflections of himself rather than inspired by real people.

Early life
Currin was born in Boulder, Colorado, and grew up in Connecticut, the son of a physics professor and a piano teacher from Oklahoma. In Connecticut as a teenager he studied painting privately with a renowned and traditionally trained Russian artist from Odessa, Ukraine, Lev Meshberg. He went to Carnegie Mellon University in Pittsburgh, where he obtained a BFA in 1984, and received a MFA from Yale University in 1986.

Career
At White Columns in New York City in 1989 he exhibited a series of portraits of young girls derived from the photographs in a high school yearbook, and initiated his efforts to distill art from traditionally clichéd subjects. In the 1990s, when political themed art works were favored, Currin brazenly used bold depictions of busty young women, mustachioed men and asexual divorcés, setting him apart from the rest. He used magazines like Cosmopolitan along with old issues of Playboy for inspiration for his paintings. In 1992 Currin moved to the Andrea Rosen Gallery, focusing, less sympathetically, on well-to-do middle-aged women. Nonetheless, by the late 1990s Currin's ability to paint subjects of kitsch with technical facility met with critical and financial success, and by 2003 his paintings were selling "for prices in the high six figures" after he moved to the Gagosian Gallery in Chelsea, New York. More recently, he has undertaken a series of figure paintings dealing with unabashedly pornographic themes, saying "One motive of mine is to see if I could make this clearly debased and unbeautiful thing become beautiful in a painting".

He has had retrospective exhibitions at the Whitney Museum of American Art and the Museum of Contemporary Art, Chicago and is represented in the permanent collections of the Hirshhorn Museum and Sculpture Garden and the Tate Gallery. Currin's Whitney retrospective of 2004 showcased the development of his career through over 40 of his displayed paintings.

In 1994 Currin met artist Rachel Feinstein at a gallery in which she was living in a self-made gingerbread house as a performance piece. However, Feinstein specializes in sculptural work. They were engaged two weeks later at Currin's show in Paris, and married three years later on Valentine's Day. They have two sons and a daughter. She has been described as his muse, which he says is "kinda corny". However, he has stated "[W]hen I met Rachel I felt that I could connect with some principles that moved my art along, that I had some freedom from the petty things in my own personality." Feinstein has appeared in many of Currin's paintings, both as a recognizable face and as a body model. In 2002 Feinstein and Currin published a 24-page book of their works at the Hydra Workshop in Hydra, Greece which they titled The Honeymooners, John Currin and Rachel Feinstein. It includes an interview conducted by Sadie Coles. In 2011 the New York Times described them as "the ruling power couple in today’s art world.

In a 2011 interview, Currin described his relationship to his work as, "...a completely ambisexual atmosphere. I think you're right if there's a reverse logic to my work It's that the pictures of men are about men and the pictures of women are about me. He has scrutinised and emulated 16th century Northern European paintings. His inspirations come from Old Master portraits and pin-ups, nymphs, and ethereal feminine prototypes, as well as his muse and wife, Feinstein. His paintings hold conversation between the grotesque and the beautiful, and range inspiration from classical artists such as Fragonard and Bouchard to Rockwell and Crumb 

Source materials
Currin has cited Danish pornography "pulled... off the Internet" as source material for his work. Specific images published by Color Climax Corporation have been identified as sources for Currin's more pornographic paintings, including compositions and small details.

Exhibitions

Solo exhibits
 2019 John Currin: My Life as a Man, Dallas Contemporary, Dallas, TX
 2013 Gagosian Gallery, Paris, France
 2012 Sadie Coles HQ, London, England
 2011 DHC/Art, Montréal, Canada
 2010 John Currin: New Paintings, Gagosian Gallery, Madison Avenue, New York, NY
 2009 John Currin: Works on Paper, A Fifteen Year Survey of Women, Andrea Rosen Gallery, New York, NY
 2008 John Currin: New Paintings, Sadie Coles HQ, London, England
 2006 Gagosian Gallery, New York, NY
 2003 Sadie Coles HQ, London, England Museum of Contemporary Art, Chicago, IL Traveled to: Serpentine Gallery, London, England; Whitney Museum of Art, New York, NY John Currin: Works on Paper, Des Moines Art Center, Des Moines, IA Traveled to: Aspen Art Museum, Aspen, CO; Milwaukee Art Museum, Milwaukee, WI
 2002 Regen Projects, Los Angeles, CA
 2001 Andrea Rosen Gallery, New York, NY
 2000 Monika Sprüth Galerie, Cologne, Germany Sadie Coles HQ, London, England
 1999 Andrea Rosen Gallery, New York, NY Regen Projects, Los Angeles, CA
 1997 Andrea Rosen Gallery, New York, NY Sadie Coles HQ, London, England
 1996 Regen Projects, Los Angeles, CA
 1995 Institute of Contemporary Art, London, England Andrea Rosen Gallery, New York Fonds Régional d’Art Contemporain, Limousin, Limoges, France Donald Young Gallery, Seattle, WA Jack Hanley Gallery, San Francisco, CA
 1994 Galerie Jennifer Flay, San Francisco, CA Andrea Rosen Gallery, New York, NY
 1993 Critical Distance, curated by Luk Lambrecht, Ado Gallery, Antwerp, Belgium Galerie Monika Sprüth, Cologne, Germany
 1992 Andrea Rosen Gallery, New York, NY
 1989 White Columns, New York, NY

Group exhibits (selected) 
 2013 NYC 1993: Experimental Jet Set, Trash and No Star, New Museum, New York, NY
 2012 Freedom Not Genius, Works from Damien Hirst's Collection, Pinacoteca Giovanni e Marella Agnelli, Turin, Italy Curators’ Series #5. Bouvard and Pécuchet's, Compendious Quest for Beauty, David Roberts Art Foundation, London, England Absentee Landlord, Walker Art Center, Minneapolis, MN
 2011 Celebrating the Golden Age, Grans Hals Museum, Amsterdam, The Netherlands The Deer, Le Consortium Dijon, Dijon, France
 2010 Lebenslust und Totentanz, Kunsthalle Krems, Krems, Austria Kupferstichkabinett: Between Thought and Action, White Cube, London, England Crash: Homage to JG Ballard, Gagosian Gallery, Britannia Street, London, England In the Company of Alice, Victoria Miro Gallery, London, England Connecticut, D’Amelio Terras, New York, NY
 2009 Mary Magdelene, The Metropolitan Opera, New York, NY Slow Paintings, Museum Morsbroich, Leverkusen, Germany Tears of Eros, Museo Thyssen-Bornemisza, Madrid, Spain Oscar Tuazon. That's Not Made For That, David Roberts Foundation, London, England Paint Made Flesh, Memorial Art Gallery of the University of Rochester, Rochester, NY Travels to: Frist Center for the Visual Arts, Nashville, TN; The Phillips Collection, Washington, D.C.
 2008 Diana And Actaeon - The Forbidden Gaze, Stiftung Museum Kunst Palast, Düsseldorf, Germany Travels to: Compton Verney, Warwickshire, England Bad Painting. Good Art, mumok - Museum of Modern Art, Vienna, Austria Pretty Ugly, Gavin Brown's Enterprise, New York, NY THE OLYMP – Works on Paper, Burkhard Eikelmann Com, Düsseldorf, Germany
 2007 Old School, Hauser & Wirth Colnaghi, London, England Travels to: Zwirner & Wirth, New York, NY Very Abstract and Hyper Figurative. Thomas Dane Gallery, London, England Insight?, Gagosian Gallery, Moscow, Russia What is Painting? – Contemporary Art from the Collection, Museum of Modern Art, New York, NY News on Paper, Galerie Burkhard Eikelmann, Düsseldorf, Germany Timer 01, Triennale Bovisa, Milan, Italy Painting Now! – Back to Figuration, Kunsthal Rotterdam, Rotterdam, The Netherlands Jake & Dinos Champan and John Currin, Magasin 3 Stockholm Konsthall, Stockholm, Sweden
 2006 In the Darkest Hour There May Be Light, Works from Damien Hirst's Murderme Collection, Serpentine Gallery, London, England Surprise, Surprise, Institute of Contemporary Arts, London, England Zurück zur Figur: Marlerei der Gegenwart, Kunsthalle der Hypo-Kulturstiftung, Munich, Germany Travels to: Kunsthal Rotterdam, Rotterdam, The Netherlands; KunstHaus Wien, Vienna, Austria Painting Codes: I Codici della Pittura, Galleria Comunale d’Arte Contemporanea di Monfalcone, Monafalcone, Italy The Power of Women, Galleria Civica di Arte Contemporanea di Trento, Trento, Italy Sweets and Beauties, Fredericks and Freiser, New York, NY New York, New York, Grimaldi Forum, Monaco
 2005 Girls on Film, curated by Kristine Bell, Zwriner and Wirth Gallery, New York, NY Drawing from the Modern, 1975–2005, Museum of Modern Art, New York, NY Idols of Perversity, Bellwether, New York, NY In Limbo. Victoria H. Myhren Gallery, University of Denver, Denver, CO Getting Emotional, Institute of Contemporary Art, Boston, MA Works on Paper, Gagosian Gallery, Beverly Hills, CA The Figurative Impulse – Works from the UBS Art Collection, Museo de Arte de Puerto Rico, Santurce, PR Fondos Regionales de Arte Contemporáneo Île-de-France y Poitou-Charentes, MAMBA – Museo de Arte Moderno de la Ciudad de Buenos Aires, Buenos Aires, Argentina Syzygy, Shaheem Modern and Contemporary Art, Cleveland, OH
 2004 SITE Santa Fe's Fifth International Biennial: Disparities and Deformations: Our Grotesque, SITE Santa Fe Biennial, Santa Fe, NM She's Come Undone, Artemis Greenberg Van Doren Gallery, New York, NY Painting Now: Selections from the Permanent Collection, Museum of Contemporary Art San Diego, San Diego, CA Selections from the Collection of William and Ruth True, Henry Art Gallery, Seattle, WA Il Nudo: Fra Ideale e Realta, Galleria d’Arte Moderna, Bologna, Italy The Charged Image: From the Collection of Douglas S. Cramer, Joseloff Gallery, West Hartford, CT Projet Cône Sud, Museo de Arte de Lima, Peru Travels to: Centro Cultural Matucana 100, Santiago, Chile; Museo de Arte Moderno de Buenos Aires, Buenos Aires, Argentina; Museo Nacional de Artes Visuales, Montevideo, Uruguay
 2003 20th Anniversary Show, Monika Sprüth/Philomene Magers, Cologne, Germany John Currin Selects, Museum of Fine Arts, Boston, MA DC: Lily van der Stokker: Small Talk, Museum Ludwig, Cologne, Germany As Time Goes By, Leo Koenig, New York, NY Inaugural Exhibition, Regen Projects, Los Angeles, CA An International Legacy: Selections from Carnegie Museum of Art, Oklahoma City Museum of Art, Oklahoma City, OK Traveled to: Nevada Museum of Art, Reno, NV; Mobile Art Museum, Mobile, AL Supernova: Art of the 1990s from the Logan Collection, San Francisco Museum of Modern Art, San Francisco, CA Reverie – Works from the Collection of Douglas S. Cramer, Speed Art Museum, Louisville, KY Pittura/painting: From Rauschenberg to Murakami, 1964–2003, Museo Correr, Venice, Italy Trésors Publics: 20 Ans de Création dans les Fonds Régionaux d’Art Contemporain, Villa Grenier, Strasbourg, France
 2002 Drawing Now: Eight Propositions, Museum of Modern Art, New York, NY Liebe Maler, male mir...Dear Painter, paint me...Cher Peintre, peins-moi, curated by Alison Gingeras, Centre Georges Pompidou, Paris, France Traveled to: Kunsthalle Wien, Vienna, Austria, Schirn Kunsthalle Frankfurt, Frankfurt-am-Main, Germany American Standard (Para) Normality and Everyday Life, Barbara Gladstone Gallery, New York, NY The Honeymooners: John Currin and Rachel Feinstein, The Hydra Workshop, Hydra, Greece Its Unfair!, Museum de Paviljoens, Almere, Spain Art for Today, Indianapolis Museum of Art, Indianapolis, IN
 2001 Form Follows Fiction, Castello di Rivoli, Turin, Italy Azerty, Centre Georges Pompidou, Paris, France Naked Since 1950, C & M Arts, New York, NY About Faces. C & M Arts, New York, NY The Way I See It, Galerie Jennifer Flay, Paris, France Drawings, Regen Projects, Los Angeles, CA
 2000Kin, Kerlin Gallery, Dublin, Ireland 00, Barbara Gladstone Gallery, New York, NY Innuendo, Dee/Glasoe Gallery, New York, NY Biennial, Whitney Museum of American Art, New York, NY Couples, Cheim & Read, New York, NY
 1999 Art Lovers, Compton House, Liverpool Biennial, Liverpool, England I'm Not Here: Constructing Identity at the Turn of the Century, The Susquehanna Art Museum, Harrisburg, PA The Great Drawing Show: 1550 to 1999, Kohn Turner Gallery, Los Angeles, CA Malerei, INIT-Kunsthalle, Berlin, Germany The Nude in Contemporary Art, Aldrich Museum of Contemporary Art, Ridgefield, CO TroubleSpot: Painting, Museum van Hedendaagse kunst Antwepren, Antwerp, Belgium Etcetera, Spacex, Exeter, England Painters: John Currin and Elizabeth Peyton, curated by Peter Schjeldahl, Carpenter Center for the Visual Arts, Harvard University, Cambridge, MA Salome: Images of Women in Contemporary Art, curated by Katherine Gass, Castle Gallery, The College of New Rochelle, NY Positioning, Center for Curatorial Studies Museum, Bard College, Annandale-on-Hudson, NY 7 Women, 7 Years Later, Andrea Rosen Gallery, New York, NY
 1998 More Fake, More Real, Yet Ever Closer, curated by Robert Evren, Castle Gallery, The College of New Rochelle, NY The Risk of Existence, Phyllis Kind Gallery, New York, NY Young Americans 2, Part Two, Saatchi Gallery, London, England From Here to Eternity: Paintings in 1998, Max Protetch Gallery, New York, NY Hungry Ghosts, Douglas Hyde Gallery, Dublin, Ireland Portraits: People, Places and Things, Marianne Boesky Gallery, New York, NY Pop Surrealism, Aldrich Museum of Contemporary Art, Aldrich, CO Now and Later, Yale University Art Gallery, New Haven, CT
 1997 Heart, Body, Mind, Soul: American Art in the 1990s, Selections from the Permanent Collection, Whitney Museum of American Art, New York, NY The Tate Gallery Selects: American Realities, Views from Abroad, European Perspectives on American Art 3, curated by Nicolas Serota and Sandy Naime, Whitney Museum of American Art, New York, NY Painting Project, Basilico Fine Arts and Lehmann Maupin, New York, NY Projects # 60: Currin, Peyton, Tuymans, curated by Laura Hoptman, Museum of Modern Art, New York, NY Feminine Image, Nassau County Museum of Art, Roslyn Harbor, NY
 1996 Figure, Taka Ishii Gallery, Tokyo, Japan Pittura, Castello di Rivara, Turin, Italy Answered Prayers, Contemporary Fine Arts, Berlin, Germany Sugar Mountain, White Columns, New York, NY Face to Face, Victoria Miro Gallery, London, England Controfigura, Studio Guenzani, Milan, Italy Narcissism: Artists Reflect Themselves, California Center for the Arts Museum, Escondido, CA
 1995 Wild Walls, Stedelijk Museum, Amsterdam, The Netherlands Travels to: Institute of Contemporary Art, London, England 25 Americans: Paintings in the 90's, Milwaukee Museum of Art, Milwaukee, WI Collection, fin XXe, Fonds Régional d’Art Contemporain Poitou-Charentes, Angoulême, France B-Movie, Phoenix Hotel, San Francisco, CA
 1994 A series of rotating installations: Week 1: John Currin and Andrea Zittel, Andrea Rosen Gallery, New York, NY Exhibited, Center for Curatorial Studies, Bard College, Annandale-on-Hudson, NY Up the Establishment, Sonnabend Gallery, NY Kathe Burkhart, John Currin, José A. Hernandez Diez, Tony Oursler, Lorna Simpson, Sue Williams, Galleria Galliani, Genoa, Italy Don't Postpone Joy or Collecting Can Be Fun! Neue Galerie, Graz, Austria Intercourse, Mustard, Brooklyn, NY
 1993 Medium Messages, Wooster Gardens, New York, NY Look at the Window, Museum Het Kruithuis, Hertogenbosch, The Netherlands After the Event, curated by Mike Hubert, Aperto 93 in conjunction with the Venice Biennale, Venice, Italy Project Unite Firminy, Unité d’Habitation Le Corbusier, Firminy, France Prospect ’93: An International Exhibition of Contemporary Art, Schirn Kunsthalle Frankfurt, Frankfurt-am-main, Germany SOHO at Duke IV. Duke University Museum of Art, Durham, NC
 1992 Figurative Work from the Permanent Collection. Whitney Museum of American Art, New York, NY Double Identity, Johnen & Schottle, Cologne, Germany Dead Cat Bounce, Robbin Lockell Gallery, Chicago, IL Galerie Rudiger Schottle, Munich, Germany Travels to: Galerie Rudiger Schottle, Paris, France New Deal, Brunno Brunnet Fine Arts, Berlin, Germany
 1991 Malerei, Johnen & Schottle, Cologne, Germany Shared Skin: Sub-Social Identifiers, Dooley Le Cappellaine Gallery, New York, NY The Good, the Bad and the Ugly: Violence and Knowledge in Recent American Art, Wesleyan University, Middletown, CT Gulliver's Travels, Sophia Ungers Galerie, Cologne, Germany 7 Women, Andrea Rosen Gallery, New York, NY John Currin and Robin Kahn, Andrea Rosen Gallery, New York, NY
 1990 (not so) Simple Pleasures, MIT List Visual Arts Center, Boston, MA
 1989 Amerikarma, Hallwalls, Buffalo, NY

References

Works cited

External links
 John Currin profile in Art + Auction
 John Currin, Sadie Coles HQ, frieze.com
 Gagosian Gallery: John Currin
 Comment on BBC

20th-century American painters
American male painters
21st-century American painters
Painters from New York City
Carnegie Mellon University College of Fine Arts alumni
Yale School of Art alumni
People from Boulder, Colorado
Painters from Colorado
1962 births
Living people